Ial or Yale was a commote of medieval Wales within the cantref of Maelor in the Kingdom of Powys. When the Kingdom was divided in 1160, Maelor became part of the Princely realm of Powys Fadog (Lower Powys or Madog's Powys), and belonged to the Royal House of Mathrafal.

History 

The capital of Yale was at Llanarmon-yn-Iâl, in Denbighshire, Wales, in a village situated at the site of a shrine that once belonged to the Roman Bishop, Germanus of Auxerre. The nearby castle, named Tomen y Faerdre, built next to a Neolithic cave, was erected by the first Prince of Wales, Owain Gwynedd, after capturing the commote of Yale from the last Prince of Powys, Madog ap Maredudd. 

The castle was later rebuilt by King John of England of the House of Plantagenet, as a way to secure the area for his military campaign against the Prince of North Wales, Llywelyn ap Iorwerth. Other castles were built in the commote such as Tomen y Rhodwydd, also built by Owain Gwynedd, in the form of a motte and bailey castle made out of timber, and the "Castle of Yale", built by the Prince of Powys Fadog, Gruffydd II ap Madog, Lord of Dinas Bran.

For iron mallets for breaking the rocks in the ditch of the castle of Yale.--The entry in the Pipe Roll for 1212-13, by King John of England when he re-occupied the site in 1212 

During the Conquest of Wales by King Edward Longshanks, Iâl would be taken very early on and added to the county of Shropshire, annexing the commote into the Kingdom of England. It would be around that time that the Welsh name Ial would be anglicised to Yale. However, the commote would remain Welsh in culture and retain Welsh laws and customs under the terms accorded by the Statute of Rhuddlan. King Edward would later merge the Lordship with others nearby, renaming it the Lordship of Bromfield and Yale, and would award it to his relative, the military commander and Guardian of Scotland, John de Warenne, 6th Earl of Surrey. 

After his successful conquest of Wales, King Edward would go on a campaign to conquer Scotland. John de Warenne would be one of his Commander at the Battle of Stirling, fighting against William Wallace, and later, fighting at the Battle of Falkirk. The title of Lord of Yale would eventually be reclaimed by the Princes of Powys Fadog, while the title of Lord of Bromfield and Yale would be passed to the Earls of Surrey of the House of Warenne, and later on, to the Earls of Arundel of the House of Howard.

The co-Lordship of Yale, when part of the Lordship of Bromfield and Yale, featured the manor of Llan Egwestl belonging to Valle Crucis Abbey, and the manor of Llandegla belonging to St Asaph Cathedral, next to Horseshoe falls, in Llangollen. The rest of the Lordship of Yale was divided into two manors called the Manor of Yale Raglaria, and the Manor of Yale Praepositura, dating back to the Welsh period before English rule. Anglicized as the Manor of Yale Raglar, it later belonged to Roger, son of John Wynne, ancestor of the Rogers of Bryntagor and the Yales of Plas-yn-Yale.

Lords of Yale

Yale was retaken from the Danish Vikings in the early 10th century during the Viking age. It was thereafter held by the Kings of Powys and granted to:
Elgud ab Gwrisnadd
Cynddelw Gam ab Elgud, his son

Along with the Lordship of Ystrad Alun, it was granted to:
Llywelyn Aurdorchog, War-chief (Welsh: penteulu) and Prime Minister to the King of Wales, Gruffydd ap Llywelyn
Llywelyn Fychan (r. 1065 – ?), his son, married to Anne, daughter of Cadwallon ap Madog, son of Prince Elystan Glodrydd
Ithel Felyn, his son, married to Lucy, daughter of Howel ab Brochwel.  
Hwfa ap Ithel Felyn, his son, married to Elen, the sister of King Owain Gwynedd, and daughter of  the King of the Welsh, Gruffydd ap Cynan
Ithel ap Hwfa,
Einion ap Rees, Lord of Yale, great-grandson of Llywelyn Aurdorchog
 
The arms of this family were azure, a lion rampant guardant or.

Before 1236, the title of Yale was eventually reclaimed or reverted to the Prince of Powys Fadog, Madog ap Gruffudd Maelor, son of Prince Gruffydd Maelor I. After his death, his sons confirmed his Lordship. In 1284, King Edward II of England, husband of Queen Isabella of France, confirmed and granted to Madog's son, Gruffydd ab Madog, the Lordship of Yale.

Gruffydd's son, Prince Gruffudd Fychan I, was the great-grandfather of  the Prince of Wales, Owain Glyndŵr, and his brother, Lord Tudor Glendower, and was a Prince of Powys Fadog of the Royal House of Mathrafal. 

His descendants, the Yale family, co-representatives of the Mathrafal Dynasty through the House of Yale, took their surname from the commote of Iâl.

See also
Llandegla
Elihu Yale

References

Commotes
History of Powys
The Lordship of Bromfield and Yale